"Life's What You Make It" is a single by Hannah Montana and is featured on the Disney Channel's Hannah Montana 2 soundtrack album. It premiered on Radio Disney. It was also performed at the Disney Channel Games 2007 concert. There is an official music video for this song, available for viewing on the Disney Channel website. The promotional music video for the song is the performance of the song at the Hannah Montana 2 concert taping. Another promotional music video shows the concert performance from the Disney Channel Games opening ceremonies as well as some clips of the cast of Hannah Montana at Walt Disney World's Magic Kingdom. "Life's What You Make It" has peaked at number 7 on the iTunes Top Songs list.

The song debuted at number 25 on the U.S. Billboard Hot 100 in July 2007, in the same week that Hannah Montana 2: Meet Miley Cyrus debuted at number one on the album chart. This song was Hannah Montana's highest debut entry, later beaten by "He Could Be The One", which entered at number 10. On March 2023, "Life's What You Make It" was certified gold by the Recording Industry Association of America (RIAA) for shipping over 500,000 copies.

A Hannah Montana DVD titled Life's What You Make It, was released on October 9, 2007.

Charts

Certification

References

2007 singles
Hannah Montana songs
Songs from television series
Songs written by Matthew Gerrard
Songs written by Robbie Nevil
Walt Disney Records singles
2007 songs